Mera Yaar Mera Dushman is a 1987 Indian Hindi-language film directed by Anil Ganguly. It stars Rakesh Roshan, Mithun Chakraborty, Bindiya Goswami, Zarina Wahab in lead roles. The film's music was composed by Bappi Lahiri.
The film was shot and completed in 1982 but got delayed for unknown reasons. Initially the film was titled Karwat. The producer even released the LP and EP records of the film under that name. Mera Yaar Mera Dushman was chosen to cash in on Mithun's action image.

Synopsis

Jagmohan & Raj Narayan are both good friends and business partners. Jagmohan's son Ashok (Rakesh Roshan) wants to become a dancer and his daughter Anita loves a boxer Vinod (Mithun Chakraborty). Narayan's son Shakti is also a boxer. Shakti and his friend Gopal do illegal works together. Shakti wants to grab Jagmohan's business and his daughter. One day Dinesh is murdered, who is the leader of the labor union. The blame for his murder is imposed on Ashok. He is completely trapped in the trap of Gopal. Will the real killer be found? Will Anita get her love?

Cast

Rakesh Roshan as Ashok
Mithun Chakraborty as Vinod Kumar
Bindiya Goswami as Anita
Zarina Wahab as Sheela
Deven Verma as Jamshedji Mukkawala
Sujit Kumar as Gopal 
A. K. Hangal as Raj Narayan Singh
Ardhendu Bose as Shakti Singh 
Pinchoo Kapoor as Seth Jagmohan 
Dina Pathak as Mrs. Jagmohan 
Ramesh Deo as Dinesh Kumar
Seema Deo as Mrs. Dinesh Kumar
Beena Banerjee as Gopal's Wheel Chair Ridden Wife 
Dinesh Hingoo as Assistant to Mukkawala
Jankidas as Gopal's Club Manager

Soundtrack
Lyrics: Gulshan Bawra

References

External links 
 

1980 films
1980s Hindi-language films
Films scored by Bappi Lahiri
Films directed by Anil Ganguly